Jaida Chanel Roby, known professionally as Pap Chanel, is an American rapper from Milledgeville, Georgia who is currently signed to Def Jam Recordings in a joint venture with UMG. She is known for her song "Gucci Bucket Hat" with American rappers Future and Herion Young.

Career
She started rapping alongside her brother between the ages of 8 and 11. In 2015, at the age of 15, she made her first official release, an appearance on American rapper Quan DaKing's single "Add It Up". In 2018, she released her debut project  The Definition of P.A.P with appearances from American rapper Lil Baby on tracks "Talk 2 Cheap" and "Freestyle". In 2020, she released her project Pretty & Paid with an appearance from Blac Youngsta on the track "2 Way Street". In July 2022, she released her project Pretty & Paid 2.0, the sequel to her 2020 project.

Musical style
She claims Nicki Minaj as her inspiration in rap.

References

External links 
 

African-American women rappers
21st-century American women musicians
Living people
People from Milledgeville, Georgia
Southern hip hop musicians
Def Jam Recordings artists
Year of birth missing (living people)